Joseph “Joe” Orewa, also known as King Cobra (born 12 June 1960) is a Nigerian boxer. He competed at the 1984 Summer Olympics in Los Angeles, in the bantamweight class. He won a gold medal at the 1982 Commonwealth Games in Brisbane.

References

External links

1960 births
Living people
Bantamweight boxers
Olympic boxers of Nigeria
Boxers at the 1984 Summer Olympics
Boxers at the 1982 Commonwealth Games
Commonwealth Games gold medallists for Nigeria
Nigerian male boxers
Commonwealth Games medallists in boxing
Medallists at the 1982 Commonwealth Games